Rod Freedman is an Australian documentary filmmaker.  He was born in Botswana in 1951 and grew up in Johannesburg, South Africa.  Freedman's grandparents were all Jewish Lithuanian and his parents, Sylvia and Mendy, were born in South Africa. The family found living under the racist Apartheid system abhorrent and migrated to Australia in 1965. As a teenager, Freedman adapted quickly to life in Sydney, appreciating the new sense of freedom, equality and democracy and attending Vaucluse Boys High School.

After completing a Bachelor of Economics at Sydney University, Freedman changed tack and studied Film and Television Production Techniques, encouraged by a friend of the family who was a filmmaker. He joined Film Australia as a production assistant, where he learnt about the film industry as he worked on a wide variety of films in various roles.

Inspired by the Challenge for Change program at the National Film Board of Canada which used video as a tool for social change, Freedman helped to start Film Australia's first video production unit, called Video Dialogue.  Freedman directed and shot a series of videos about young people leaving school and looking for work, called Unemployment Is Not Working.

He travelled for five years in Europe, North Africa and the Middle East including working as a teacher for two years in Southern Sudan where he lived in Yambio, a remote community without electricity and running water.

Returning to Australia in 1985, Freedman helped form Summer Hill Films, specialising in discussion-starter videos known as trigger films. In 1998, Freedman and his partner Lesley Seebold formed Change Focus Media to produce corporate videos and TV documentaries. Freedman is particularly interested in stories about people and their life’s journeys.

Freedman’s personal film about his Lithuanian great uncle, Uncle Chatzkel (1999, SBS), had two AFI nominations and screened in many film festivals. One Last Chance (2000, SBS), about a Lithuanian war criminal, won three awards in the US.

He initiated and produced the Tudawali Award-winning series, Everyday Brave (2002, SBS), working with emerging Aboriginal directors to tell stories of unknown Aboriginal people who have made a difference to their communities.

Freedman co-produced Welcome to the Waks Family (2003, SBS) about an orthodox Jewish family with 17 children. After this he produced and directed three series of Australian Biography (2003–2008, SBS), featuring significant Australians reflecting on their lives.

He produced Crossing the Line (2005,ABC) about two medical students working in a remote Aboriginal community (Best Documentary Social and Political Issues, ATOM Awards and other awards).

He returned to South Africa in 2004 as producer/director of Wrong Side of the Bus (2010, ABC), which screened in Australia, USA, Canada, Israel, UK and South Africa and won Best African Documentary, International Film Festival South Africa.

Freedman was  producer and main cinematographer of TV feature documentary  Once My Mother (2014, ABC TV), directed by Sophia Turkiewicz.

Filmography

Director
2012 A Unique Profession (documentary & educational resource)
2009 Wrong Side of the Bus (documentary) 
2008 Looking for a Monster (short) (co-director)
2003-2007 Australian Biography (TV series)
2001 One Last Chance (investigative documentary)
2000 Uncle Chatzkel (documentary)

Producer
2013 Once My Mother (documentary)
2012 A Unique Profession (documentary & educational resource)
2009 Wrong Side of the Bus (documentary)
2008 Looking for a Monster (short)  
2005 Crossing The Line (documentary)
2003 -2007 Australian Biography (TV series)
2003 Everyday Brave Series TV series)
2002 Welcome To The Waks Family (documentary)
2001 One Last Chance (investigative documentary)
2000 Uncle Chatzkel (documentary)

References
 

Australian documentary filmmakers
Living people
Year of birth missing (living people)